Domee Shi (born 8 September 1989) is a Canadian animator, director and screenwriter. She directed the 2018 short film Bao and the 2022 feature film Turning Red, becoming the first woman to direct a short film and then the first woman with sole director's credit on a feature film for Pixar. 

She began working for Pixar in 2011 as a storyboard artist, contributing to multiple films, including Inside Out (2015), Incredibles 2 (2018), and Toy Story 4 (2019). 

For Bao, she won an Academy Award for Best Animated Short Film at the 91st Academy Awards, and also earned nominations for the 43rd Annie Awards, the International Online Cinema Awards, and the Tribeca Film Festival.

Early life
Shi was born on 8 September 1989 in Chongqing, Sichuan (now Chongqing municipality) as an only child before immigrating to Canada at the age of two with her parents. She spent six months in Newfoundland before moving to Toronto, where she grew up learning about art from her father. She was influenced by her father, who had been a college professor of fine arts and a landscape painter in China. Shi took inspiration and guidance from her mother's personality when directing Bao. Shi recalls that "My Chinese mom was always making sure I never wandered away too far, that I was safe." During her childhood, Shi watched many Studio Ghibli and Disney films, which exposed her to Asian cinema and animation.

As a high school student, Shi watched anime, read manga, and became the Vice President of her school's anime club. She joined online art communities and uploaded her fan artwork to DeviantArt. This became her first exposure to an environment of like-minded people that helped her establish a network with other artists. "I could follow artists, and I could email them. In the past, you'd have to be in California or know a guy who was friends with this other guy that worked at Disney or something," said Shi. Thus Shi was inspired to enroll at Sheridan College for her post-secondary education.

At Sheridan, Shi studied animation, graduating in 2011. During her second year at Sheridan, she enrolled in a course taught by Nancy Beiman, whose class she credits for her pursuit of storyboarding. Shi created a short film for an assignment during her last year at Sheridan. In 2009, she undertook an internship with Chuck Gammage Animation as a clean-up artist, inbetweener, storyboard artist, and animator.

Career
After graduating, Shi worked briefly as a cartooning instructor with an emphasis on character design and comic book creation. In 2011, she accepted a three-month internship at Pixar as a storyboard artist. This was her second attempt, having initially been turned down by the animation studio and others, such as Disney and DreamWorks. Shi wrote an animated webcomic series titled My Food Fantasies in 2014, in which she drew "outlandish" situations involving food. Shi later said that she developed her interest in writing stories about food while making My Food Fantasies. The first feature film she worked on with Pixar was Inside Out (2015), on which she served as a storyboard artist. After briefly working on The Good Dinosaur, Shi began working on Toy Story 4 in 2015. She also drew storyboards for the 2018 film Incredibles 2, where she worked on a sequence featuring the characters Jack-Jack and Edna Mode.

Directing
The short film Bao (2018) was developed as a "side-project" before and during Shi's full-time work on Inside Out. Bao, alongside two other projects, was eventually pitched to her mentor, Pete Docter, and Pixar for support. Bao was approved in 2015, making Shi the first woman to direct a short film for the studio. The eight-minute short debuted at the 2018 Tribeca Film Festival, where it preceded Incredibles 2 in theaters. Shi won the Academy Award for Best Animated Short Film for Bao, becoming the first woman of color to win the award.

On May 8, 2018, it was reported that Shi was directing a feature film at Pixar. On November 26, 2018, Shi confirmed that she was working on a film at the studio. Shi also said that the film was in early stages of development, with the story still being worked on, and that she was "really excited to play in this new 90-minute film format." On January 1, 2019, Shi said that she planned the film to be "entertaining and emotional." On December 9, 2020, Shi's film was announced with the title Turning Red. It was originally scheduled to be released in theaters on March 11, 2022, but due to rising cases of SARS-CoV-2 Omicron variant, it was instead released direct-to-streaming on Disney+ on the same date. Disney said Turning Red was the number one streaming title on Disney+, and in early April 2022, Pixar promoted Shi to vice president of creative, alongside Andrew Stanton, Peter Sohn and Dan Scanlon.

On October 5, 2022, Shi was confirmed to be developing another original Pixar feature film.

Influences
Shi is influenced by her father's art, as he was her art teacher while growing up. "Like, I asked him what he thought [of the film] and he said, 'I really liked it, but I also have notes for you.' And I was like, Ah, that's my classic dad," Shi said.

In an interview with Now Magazine, Shi said that the animated films My Neighbors the Yamadas (1999) and Spirited Away (2001) were her influences when creating Bao.

Shi says that most of her ideas come from specific cultures around her. Because audiences started to appreciate other stories with different background and culture after Sanjay's Super Team and Coco, Shi thinks it important to draw upon various sources and background in order to create uniqueness in film.

Filmography

Feature films

Short films

Television

Disney+ Original Specials

Awards and nominations

Notes

References

External links
 

1989 births
Artists from Chongqing
Artists from Toronto
Asian-Canadian filmmakers
Canadian animated film directors
Canadian women animators
Chinese animated film directors
Chinese animators
Chinese emigrants to Canada
Chinese women animators
Chinese women film directors
Canadian expatriate film directors in the United States
Canadian women film directors
Directors of Best Animated Short Academy Award winners
Film directors from Chongqing
Film directors from Toronto
Living people
Pixar people
Sheridan College alumni
Canadian storyboard artists
Chinese storyboard artists